Helianthella parryi, common name Parry's dwarf-sunflower, is a North American plant species in the family Asteraceae. It grows in the southwestern United States, in the States of Arizona, New Mexico, Colorado, and Utah.

The plant usually produces only one yellow flower heads per stem, though sometimes 2 or 3. Heads are nodding (hanging). Each head contains 8-14 yellow ray flowers surrounding numerous yellow disc flowers.

References

External links

parryi
Flora of the Southwestern United States
Plants described in 1864